The Netherlands was the host nation for the 1928 Summer Olympics in Amsterdam. 266 competitors, 222 men and 44 women, took part in 103 events in 17 sports.

Medalists
On 11 August, the Netherlands won 7 medals on a single day. This remained the country's record until it won 8 medals on 28 July 2021 during the 2020 Summer Olympics.

Athletics

Men
Track & road events

Field events

Boxing

Cycling

Eleven cyclists, all men, represented the Netherlands in 1928.
Individual road race
 Leen Buis
 Janus Braspennincx
 Ben Duijker
 Anton Kuys

 Team road race
 Leen Buis
 Janus Braspennincx
 Ben Duijker

Sprint
 Antoine Mazairac

Time trial
 Gerard Bosch van Drakestein

Tandem
 Bernard Leene
 Daan van Dijk

Team pursuit
 Janus Braspennincx
 Jan Maas
 Jan Pijnenburg
 Piet van der Horst
 Gerard Bosch van Drakestein

Diving

Equestrian

Fencing

20 fencers, 17 men and 3 women, represented the Netherlands in 1928.

Men's foil
 Nicolaas Nederpeld
 Frans Mosman
 Paul Kunze

Men's team foil
 Frans Mosman, Doris de Jong, Nicolaas Nederpeld, Paul Kunze, Wouter Brouwer, Otto Schiff

Men's épée
 Willem Driebergen
 Pieter Mijer
 Arie de Jong

Men's team épée
 Leonard Kuypers, Arie de Jong, Henri Wijnoldy-Daniëls, Willem Driebergen, Alfred Labouchere, Karel John van den Brandeler

Men's sabre
 Arie de Jong
 Jan van der Wiel
 Henri Wijnoldy-Daniëls

Men's team sabre
 Cornelis Ekkart, Hendrik Hagens, Maarten van Dulm, Jan van der Wiel, Arie de Jong, Henri Wijnoldy-Daniëls

Women's foil
 Jo de Boer
 Adriana Admiraal-Meijerink
 Friederike Koderitsch

Football

Round of 16

Consolation tournament, First round

Consolation tournament, Final

After a coin toss the Netherlands were declared winners and were handed the trophy which had been on offer (by the NVB), but gave it to Chile to take home as a 'memento' of the Netherlands, the Olympic Games and their Dutch football friends.

Gymnastics

Hockey

Roster

 Group play

Gold Medal Match

Modern pentathlon

Three male pentathletes represented the Netherlands in 1928.

Rowing

Sailing

Swimming

Water Polo

Weightlifting

Wrestling

Art competitions

Demonstration sports

Korfball

Two Dutch teams gave a korfball demonstration, with a match on 6 August in the Olympisch Stadion.

References

External links
Official Olympic Reports
International Olympic Committee results database

Nations at the 1928 Summer Olympics
1928
Olympics